John Finlay (10 June 1889 – 30 September 1942) was an Irish athlete who played hurling for Laois in the 1910s and in later life was a politician.

Finlay was born in Ballycuddy, County Laois in 1889. He had a love of hurling from a young age and soon joined his local club Ballygeehan. In 1913 Finlay won a Laois Junior Hurling Championship with the club. They moved to senior level the following year and proceeded to win five county championships in-a-row with Finlay as captain. After winning the county title in 1914 the club had a major say in the selection of the inter-county team for the following year. Finlay was chosen as captain and was joined by his brother Tom Finlay.

That year Laois defeated Offaly, Kilkenny and Dublin to win the Leinster Championship. This victory set up an All-Ireland final meeting with Cork, who were red-hot favourites. Laois had no great hurling tradition and this was shown when Cork scored three goals. In the second-half, however, Laois rallied and won the game. Finlay became the only player from Laois to captain an All-Ireland Senior Hurling Championship winning team.

In later life Finlay entered politics, and was elected to Dáil Éireann as a National Centre Party Teachta Dála (TD) for the Leix–Offaly constituency at the 1933 general election. He was re-elected at the 1937 general election for the same constituency as a Fine Gael TD. He lost his seat at the 1938 general election.

Jack Finlay died on 30 September 1942.

References

 

1889 births
1942 deaths
Laois inter-county hurlers
Clough-Ballacolla hurlers
Politicians from County Laois
National Centre Party (Ireland) TDs
Fine Gael TDs
Irish sportsperson-politicians
Members of the 8th Dáil
Members of the 9th Dáil